Charles Francis Hutchison (1879, Cape Coast - ca. 1940, Lagos) was a surveyor and scholar active in the British Gold Coast.

Hutchison was born with varied African, Dutch, and Scottish ancestors. He was a great-great-grandson Carel Hendrik Bartels (1792 – 1850).

References

1879 births
1940 deaths